Cristo Rey is a village in the Corozal District of Belize, mainly consisting from people of Maya descent. Most of the villagers in  Cristo Rey speak Yucatec Maya and Spanish very well.

References

Populated places in Corozal District
Maya peoples